Bruno Madaule (4 March 1971 – 13 September 2020) was a French comic book author. He graduated from the École d'Architecture de Toulouse in 1988. He died on 13 September 2020 from cancer.

Publications
Les Zinzinventeurs (2001–2005)
35 heures & cie (2005)
Tout ce que vous avez toujours voulu savoir sur le Père Noël (2008)
Givrés ! (2009–2016)

Awards
"Angoulême International Comics Festival Prix Jeunesse 7–8 ans" for Les Zinzinventeurs (2002)

References

1971 births
2020 deaths
French comics artists
People from Castres
Deaths from cancer in France
Place of death missing